Eddie Neufville (born 16 November 1976) is a Liberian sprinter. He competed in the men's 4 × 100 metres relay at the 1996 Summer Olympics.

References

1976 births
Living people
Athletes (track and field) at the 1996 Summer Olympics
Liberian male sprinters
Olympic athletes of Liberia
Place of birth missing (living people)